The creation of life may refer to:

 Origin of life, current scientific beliefs about the beginning of living things on Earth
 Creation myths, cultural and/or religious beliefs